Ståle Storløkken (born 22 February 1969 in Dombås, Norway) is a Norwegian jazz musician (keyboards, organ and piano) and composer, known for collaborations with artists like Terje Rypdal, BigBang, Supersilent and Motorpsycho. He is married to the Norwegian singer Tone Åse.

Career
Storløkken was educated on the Jazz program at Trondheim Musikkonservatorium (1988–90), and subsequently did his postgraduate there too. During the studies he started the band Veslefrekk together with fellow students Arve Henriksen and Jarle Vespestad (Helge Sten joined the band at a later stage). In 1997 the name of the band changed to Supersilent. They have released six critically acclaimed albums on the label Rune Grammofon. From 1995 he played in the trio BOL along with his wife Tone Åse and Tor Haugerud.

Storløkken has been active in many contexts, both as a band leader and member, for example The Stoken Experience,  and Terje Rypdal's Skywards. Along with Christian Wallumrød, and he composed the commissioned work Eight Thirty to Kongsberg Jazz Festival 1994. He has collaborated on a number of albums with the named bands, and otherwise at such musicians as Gunnar Andreas Berg, Eldbjørg Raknes, Audun Kleive and Thomas Strønen.

Storløkken together with Thomas Strønen has the Humcrush duo, which has released three albums. He also plays in the trio Elephant9, along with Torstein Lofthus and Nikolai Eilertsen.

Discography

1991: Block Songs (Pop Eye), with Epinastic Movements
1993: En flik av ... (Bodega), with Bodega Band
1994: Veslefrekk (NorCD), with Veslefrekk
1996: Frode (Necessary Prod.), with Frode Alnæs
1996: The Music Machine (Curling Legs), with Gunnar Andreas Berg
1996: Letters (Turn Left), with Håvard Lund
1997: By-Music (Da-Da), with Didrik Ingvaldsen
1998: Read My Lips (EMI), with Ole Edvard Antonsen
1998: Point (Dragon), with Anders Kjellberg
1998: The Norske Jazzscene - turnéer vinter/vår 1998 (Den Norske Jazzscene), with various artists
1999: Cosmic Ballet (Bergland Productions), with Pocket Corner
1999: Det bor en gammel baker... (Via Music), with Eldbjørg Raknes
2000: History and Movement (Via Music), with Didrik Ingvaldsen
2000: Floating Rhythms (Via Music), with Terje Isungset
2000: Generator X (Jazzland), with Audun Kleive Generator X
2000/2001: Cure (Music Network, with Cadillac
2001: European Improvised Music (Nor CD/Sofa), with various artists
2001: BOL (Via Music), with BOL
2001: New Cumber (Bergland Productions), with Cucumber Slumber
2002: Denne lille pytten er et hav (Curling Legs), with Sverre Gjørvad
2002: Blokk 80 (2002), with S. Møller Storband
2003: Money Will Ruin Everything (Rune Grammofon), with various artists
2004: Ohmagoddabl (Jazzland), with Audun Kleive Generator X
2004: No Slumber (Bergland Productions), with Cucumber
2004: Runeology2 (Rune grammofon), with various artists
2004: Valse Mysterioso (NorCD), with Veslefrekk
2004: Humcrush (Rune Grammofon), with Humcrush
2005: Runeology (Bomba records), with various artists
2005: Silver Sun (Curling Legs), with BOL
2005: Chime (Spicytuna), with Lisbeth Diers
2006: Until human voices wake us and we drown (Rune Grammofon), with various artists
2006: Vossabrygg (ECM), with Terje Rypdal
2006: Hornswoggle (Rune Grammofon), with Humcrush
2006: Poetic Terrorism (Grandsport), with BigBang
2007: Strjon (Rune Grammofon), with Arve Henriksen
2008: Skylab (NorCD), with BOL
2008: St Fin Barre's (Leo Records), with Mark O'Leary & Stein Inge Brækhus
2010: Very Much Alive (Jazzland (6xCD, Album)), with Paolo Vinaccia featuring Terje Rypdal, Ståle Storløkken & Palle Mikkelborg
2012: The Death Defying Unicorn (Stickman Records (Germany)), with Motorpsycho
2012: Numb, Number (Gigafon Records), with BOL
2015: En Konsert For Folk Flest (Rune Grammofon), with Motorpsycho
2019: The Haze Of Sleeplessness (Hubro)
2020: Conspiracy (ECM), with Terje Rypdal
2021: "Ghost Caravan" (Hubro)

References

External links 

Ståle Storløkken Biography Store Norske Leksikon (in Norwegian)
 
 

Motorpsycho members
20th-century Norwegian organists
21st-century Norwegian organists
20th-century Norwegian pianists
21st-century Norwegian pianists
Male organists
Norwegian jazz pianists
Musicians from Dombås
Norwegian jazz composers
Norwegian University of Science and Technology alumni
Rune Grammofon artists
Living people
1969 births
Male jazz composers
Elephant9 members
Supersilent members
Trondheim Jazz Orchestra members
BOL (band) members
Generator X (band) members
Veslefrekk members